Reticulitermes hageni, the light southeastern subterranean termite, is a species of termite in the family Rhinotermitidae. It is found in North America.

References

Further reading

 

Termites
Articles created by Qbugbot
Insects described in 1920